Maurice Greene (born July 23, 1974) is an American former track and field sprinter who competed in the 60 meters, 100 meters, and 200 meters. He is a former 100 m world record holder with a time of 9.79 seconds. During the height of his career (1997–2004) he won four Olympic medals and was a five-time World Champion. This included three golds at the 1999 World Championships, a feat which had previously only been achieved by Carl Lewis and Michael Johnson and has since been equaled by three others.

His career was affected by a number of injuries from 2001 onwards, although he won the 100 meters bronze and silver in the sprint relay at the 2004 Summer Olympics. Greene was also successful indoors: he was the 1999 Indoor World Champion, was the world record holder in the 60-meter dash for nearly 20 years and remains the joint-fastest man over 50 meters. He raced sparingly after an injury in 2005 and officially retired in 2008. Over his career, he made the third most sub-10-second runs (52) in the 100m, tied with Usain Bolt and only surpassed by Asafa Powell and Justin Gatlin.

Following his track career he has become an ambassador for the IAAF and a TV personality, appearing on Identity, Blind Date, and Dancing with the Stars. Most recently he volunteered as a track coach at University of California at Los Angeles (UCLA) for the 2012–2013 season.

Since then he has become a Physical Education teacher at American Leadership Academy in Arizona.

Early life
Greene was born in Kansas City, Kansas and attended F.L. Schlagle High School. In his youth and high school, he participated in both American football and track and field. After high school, Greene received a Track scholarship to the University of Kansas. Greene also attended Park University and Kansas City Kansas Community College.

Sports career

Early career and breakthrough
In 1995 he took part in his first major international tournament at the World Championships in Gothenburg, but was eliminated in the 100 m quarter-finals. His next season was disappointing, as he failed to make the American team for the 1996 Summer Olympics in Atlanta.  After watching the Olympic final from the stands, Greene made his way to Los Angeles to seek the coaching of John Smith. He joined the start up HSI group.  He went on to become the group's most visible member.

The following season would be his breakthrough. At the World Championships in Athens, Greene won the 100 m title. This marked the beginning of Greene's dominance in the 100 m. He successfully defended his title in 1999 and 2001 and captured the Olympic gold medal in the 2000 Olympics. He was also successful at the 200 m. At the 1999 World Championships, he also won the 200 m title, the first to win both sprint events at a World Championships. However, he did not run the 200 m at the 2000 Olympics after an injury at the US trials.

World record holder and athletic prime
In 1999 he set the 100 m world record at 9.79 s (+0.1 m/s wind), beating Donovan Bailey's standing world record of 9.84 s (+0.7 m/s wind), and lowering the world record by the largest margin since the advent of electronic timing. Greene also matched Bailey's 50 m indoor world record time, but the run was never ratified. He also set the 60 m indoor world record twice. His 60 m indoor record is currently at 6.39 seconds. In addition, Maurice Greene was the only sprinter to hold the 60 m and 100 m world records at the same time. The previous IAAF logo was created in Greene's image.

In 2002, Greene lost his 100 m world record to fellow American Tim Montgomery, who beat his time by 0.01 (9.78 s +2.0 m/s), while Greene himself was injured and watched the race from the stands; Montgomery has since been found guilty of using performance-enhancing drugs, and his record has been retroactively rescinded. The record was broken legitimately by Asafa Powell in 2005 with a time of 9.77 s (+1.6 m/s wind).

At the 2004 Summer Olympics in Athens, Greene added to his medal tally with the bronze after finishing third in his attempt to defend his 100 m title to Justin Gatlin, and a silver as the anchor leg runner on the United States 4 × 100 m relay team, narrowly denied another Olympic Gold by the British team, who won by 0.01 seconds.

Greene ran 52 sub-10-second 100 m races during his career, which at the time was more than any other sprinter in history. This record has now been surpassed by Asafa Powell who has 97 100 m sub-10-second runs to his name and Justin Gatlin who has 64 100 m sub-10-second runs to his name and equalled by Usain Bolt who has the same amount of sub-10-second runs with 52. Previously Greene had held the record for the most wind-legal sub-10-second clockings for 100 m in one season, when he ran 9 sub-10s in 1999. This record was also broken by Asafa Powell in 2006 (12), and it was improved by Powell in 2008 to 15.

On December 21, 2006, he appeared as one of the "strangers" on the NBC game show Identity. The contestant, a self-professed track and field fan, incorrectly identified him by name as Marion Jones, although she identified him as the "world's fastest man."

Post-running
On February 4, 2008, Greene announced his retirement from track and field in Beijing, citing nagging injuries and a wish to see new individuals succeed in the sport. Greene said he hopes to pursue coaching and business interests.

In April 2008, the New York Times reported that Greene had paid Mexican discus thrower  Angel Guillermo Heredia $10,000, which Heredia claimed was in payment for performance-enhancing drugs.  Greene admitted meeting Heredia and making the payment, but claimed it was common for him to pay for "stuff" for other members of his training group, and reiterated that he had never used banned drugs.

Greene was a contestant on Season 7 of Dancing with the Stars, and was paired with two-time champion Cheryl Burke. He was eliminated on Week 8 of the competition, taking 5th place. He hyperextended his leg during the competition. He later helped out in their pro-dancer competition and danced a Tango with future winner Anna Demidova. Greene also appeared on the American television series Blind Date where he was paired with a woman named Christie. Greene and Christie agreed that they would see each other again.

He has a tattoo that reads GOAT referring to his claim to be "Greatest of All Time".

Media
In an event set up by ESPN's Todd Gallagher, Greene appeared in the book "Andy Roddick Beat Me With a Frying Pan" racing in a 100-meter race against the book's editor, who had a 31-meter head start and the help of a moving sidewalk. Greene lost by a nose.

Maurice Greene hosted the monthly show "Greene Light" on Eurosport where he met stars of athletics, such as Blanka Vlašić, Allyson Felix and Churandy Martina.

Greene was also the cover athlete for the multi-platform video game International Track & Field 2000, which was developed by Konami.

Personal bests

International competitions

National competitions

Meeting wins
IAAF Golden League
Golden Gala 100 m: 1999, 2000, 2001, 2002
Golden Gala 200 m: 2000
Meeting de Paris 100 m: 2001, 2002
Meeting de Paris 200 m: 1999
Internationales Stadionfest 100 m: 1998, 2000
Internationales Stadionfest 200 m: 1999
Memorial Van Damme 100 m: 1998, 2000
Weltklasse Zürich 100 m: 1999, 2000
Other
Athens Grand Prix Tsiklitiria 100 m: 1999
Osaka Grand Prix 100 m: 2000
New Balance Indoor Grand Prix 60 m: 1999

Dancing with the Stars

See also
List of men's Olympic and World Championship athletics sprint champions
List of 100 metres national champions (men)
List of 2000 Summer Olympics medal winners
List of 2004 Summer Olympics medal winners
100 metres at the Olympics
4×100 metres relay at the Olympics
100 metres at the World Championships in Athletics
200 metres at the World Championships in Athletics
4×100 metres relay at the World Championships in Athletics
List of people from Kansas City, Kansas

References

External links

 
 
 
 
 
 

1974 births
Living people
People from Granada Hills, Los Angeles
Sportspeople from Kansas City, Kansas
Track and field athletes from Kansas
Track and field athletes from California
American male sprinters
African-American male track and field athletes
World record setters in athletics (track and field)
Olympic bronze medalists for the United States in track and field
Olympic gold medalists for the United States in track and field
Olympic silver medalists for the United States in track and field
Athletes (track and field) at the 2000 Summer Olympics
Athletes (track and field) at the 2004 Summer Olympics
Medalists at the 2000 Summer Olympics
Medalists at the 2004 Summer Olympics
World Athletics Indoor Championships winners
World Athletics Championships medalists
World Athletics Championships athletes for the United States
Goodwill Games medalists in athletics
Participants in American reality television series
IAAF Golden League winners
BBC Sports Personality World Sport Star of the Year winners
USA Outdoor Track and Field Championships winners
USA Indoor Track and Field Championships winners
World Athletics Championships winners
Competitors at the 1998 Goodwill Games
21st-century African-American sportspeople
20th-century African-American sportspeople